711 Marmulla is an asteroid belonging to the Flora family in the Main Belt. It was discovered 1 March 1911 by Austrian astronomer Johann Palisa. The asteroid name may be derived from the Old High German word 'marmul', which means 'marble'. The orbital plane of 711 Marmulla is inclined at an angle of 6.1° to the plane of the ecliptic.

This result is consistent with a similar study earlier in the year. A. Kryszczynska and associates had found a slightly longer rotation period of 2.88 hours in 2012. The low amplitude of the variation suggests a nearly spherical shape. The spectrum of 711 Marmulla most closely matches an A-type asteroid.

References

External links
 
 

Flora asteroids
19110301
Marmulla
Marmulla